Rajendra University, formerly known as Rajendra Autonomous College is situated in Balangir, Odisha, India.

History
The university was established as an Intermediate college in 1944 by Maharaja Rajendra Narayan Singh Deo, the erstwhile King of Patna State and one of the former Chief Ministers of Odisha as Rajendra College.

It started degree courses in July 1944 by offering B.A. (pass) class. It became a full-fledged degree college after the affiliation of Commerce Faculty (B.Com. class) in 1964–65 and Science faculty (B.Sc. class) in 1965–66. From 1978 to 1979, it started offering post graduate courses in Arts, Science and Commerce. From 1967 to 2002, this college was affiliated to Sambalpur University.

The college was granted autonomy from 1 April 2002.

In December 2019, the college celebrated its platinum anniversary where Vice President of India Venkaiah Naidu was about to come, but couldn't because of bad weather. Somehow he delivered a video message and inaugurated the function.

It was upgraded by the Government of Odisha into a university on 1 September 2020. Deepak Kumar Behera was appointed as first vice chancellor of this university.

On 2020, Chief Minister of Odisha sanctions 50 crores for development of this university.

Academics
The college offers three-year degree courses and two-year post-graduate degree programmes in following departments.

Arts

 Department of English
 Department of History
 Department of Pol.Sc.
 Department of Economics
 Department of Odia
 Department of Hindi
 Department of Sanskrit
 Department of Geography
 Department of Mathematics
 Department of Education
 Department of Philosophy

Science

 Department of Physics
 Department of Chemistry
 Department of Botany
 Department of Zoology
 Department of Mathematics
 Department of Computer Science

Commerce

 Department of Commerce

Affiliated colleges
The university has jurisdiction over colleges in Balangir and Subarnapur district.

References

External links
Rajendra University Balangir website
Rajendra College Balangir photo gallery

                                                                                                                       

Balangir
Department of Higher Education, Odisha
Autonomous Colleges of Odisha
Universities and colleges in Odisha
Educational institutions established in 1944
1944 establishments in India
Colleges affiliated to Sambalpur University